Chase Robert Buford (born October 25, 1988) is an American professional basketball coach and former player who is the head coach of the Sydney Kings of the Australian National Basketball League (NBL). He played college basketball at Kansas, where he was a part of their 2008 NCAA Tournament-winning team. Buford has also been the head coach of the Wisconsin Herd of the NBA G League.

Coaching career 
Buford began his basketball career as regional scout with the Atlanta Hawks of the National Basketball Association (NBA) before being promoted to video intern. He went on to be the coordinator of player development for the Chicago Bulls from 2015 to 2017 before becoming an assistant for the Erie Bayhawks, the G League affiliate of the Hawks in 2017. He was named an assistant for the Delaware Blue Coats, the G League affiliate of the Philadelphia 76ers on September 14, 2018.

Wisconsin Herd 
Buford was named the head coach of the Wisconsin Herd, the G League affiliate of the Milwaukee Bucks in 2019. In 2020, Buford led the Herd to a first place finish, though the league season was suspended and ultimately cancelled due to the coronavirus pandemic. In 2021, he made national news when he got suspended for two games for a rant about the officiating during a game in which his team blew a 21-point lead in the fourth quarter. He later issued an apology, saying he was "unprofessional" and "embarrassed".

Sydney Kings 
Buford was hired as the head coach of the Sydney Kings of the NBL on June 25, 2021. He led the Kings to the 2022 and 2023 NBL championships.

Personal life 
Buford's father R. C. was an assistant coach at Kansas and for the San Antonio Spurs, and is currently the CEO of the Spurs.

References

External links 
 
 Kansas Jayhawks profile

1988 births
Living people
American men's basketball players
Atlanta Hawks scouts
Basketball coaches from Texas
Basketball players from San Antonio
Chicago Bulls executives
Delaware Blue Coats coaches
Erie BayHawks (2017–2019) coaches
Kansas Jayhawks men's basketball players
Point guards
Shooting guards
Sportspeople from San Antonio
Sydney Kings coaches
Wisconsin Herd coaches